Baker Hot Springs are a series of geothermal spring located on Fumarole Butte, northwest of the town of Delta, Utah. They were formerly known as Crater Springs and Abraham Hot Springs.

Water profile
The hot mineral water emerges from the spring at 180 °F/82 °C. The primary mineral content is manganese, and water has a high sulphur content giving it the characteristic "rotten egg" smell.

The spring water discharges at 17 gallons per second, and flows into three concrete soaking pools, approximately 5' x 8'; these concrete structures are all that is left of an old resort. Next to the soaking pools is a channel with cold spring water that can be diverted into the soaking pools to cool the water. Nearby are hot water seeps that can be dug out to create primitive soaking pools.

Geology
The hot springs and seeps are located on Fumarole Butte which is a basaltic andesite type of shield volcano from the Quaternary period, overlaying basalt and rhyolite.

See also
 List of hot springs in the United States
 List of hot springs in the world

References

Hot springs of Utah